= Results of the 1878 Canadian federal election =

1878 Canadian federal election

== Results by Province ==
=== British Columbia ===
Results in British Columbia
Party	Seats	Second	Third	Fourth	Votes	%	+/-
Liberal–Conservative	2	1	0	0	1,163	35.05	
Unknown	0	2	1	1	893	26.91	
Liberals	2	0	0	0	874	26.34	
Independent	1	0	0	0	388	11.69	
Conservative	1	0	0	0	0	0	
Total	6				3,318	100.0	

=== Manitoba ===
Results in Manitoba
Party	Seats	Second	Votes	%	+/-
Independent Conservative	1	0	555	50.41	
Conservative	2	1	546	49.59	
Liberal–Conservative	1	0	0	0	
Total	4		1,101	100.0	

=== New Brunswick ===
Results in New Brunswick
Party	Seats	Second	Third	Fourth	Fifth	Votes	%	+/-
Liberals	9	4	1	0	1	19,695	49.39	
Unknown	0	5	1	1	0	6,880	17.25	
Independent	2	2	1	0	0	5,112	12.82	
Liberal–Conservative	3	1	0	0	0	4,400	11.03	
Conservative	1	1	0	0	0	2,303	5.77	
Independent Liberal	1	0	0	0	0	1,490	3.74	
Total	16					39,880	100.0	

=== Nova Scotia ===
Results in Nova Scotia
Party	Seats	Second	Third	Votes	%	+/-
Liberals	7	8	2	19,704	30.71	
Liberal–Conservative	6	2	0	16,783	26.16	
Conservative	8	1	0	14,290	22.27	
Unknown	0	6	3	7,825	12.2	
Independent	0	1	0	2,863	4.46	
Independent Liberal	0	0	1	2,695	4.2	
Total	21			64,160	100.0	

=== Ontario ===
Results in Ontario
Party	Seats	Second	Third	Fourth	Votes	%	+/-
Liberals	26	30	1	0	95,639	35.45	
Conservative	37	8	0	0	69,013	25.58	
Unknown	0	40	6	1	52,918	19.62	
Liberal–Conservative	24	5	0	0	45,133	16.73	
Independent	1	1	0	0	4,193	1.55	
Independent Liberal	0	2	0	0	2,877	1.07	
Total	88				269,773	100.0	

=== Prince Edward Island ===
Results in Prince Edward Island
Party	Seats	Second	Third	Votes	%	+/-
Conservative	3	0	0	8,454	34.37	
Liberals	1	2	1	7,098	28.85	
Unknown	0	1	2	5,128	20.85	
Liberal–Conservative	2	0	0	3,919	15.93	
Total	6			24,599	100.0	
